Northeye is the site of an abandoned medieval village known as Hooe Level on the Pevensey Levels, west of Bexhill-on-Sea. The village is mentioned as a dependent limb of the Cinque Port of Hastings in a charter of 1229. It is thought to have been deserted around 1400 AD. The village consisted of houses and a flint built chapel, The Chapel of St James.

Before the Pevensey Marshes were silted up and reclaimed, Northeye was an island in an inlet that reached inland to Hailsham.

References

Geography of East Sussex
History of East Sussex
Bexhill-on-Sea